The 19th Fighter Squadron is a United States Air Force fighter jet squadron and is a part of the Pacific Air Forces' (PACAF) 15th Wing based at Joint Base Pearl Harbor–Hickam, Hawaii.

The squadron is one of the oldest in the United States Air Force, its origins dating to 14 June 1917, being organized at Kelly Field, Texas.  It served overseas in France as part of the American Expeditionary Force during World War I. The squadron saw combat during World War II, and became part of the Tactical Air Command during the Cold War.

Today the 19th FS operates the F-22 Raptor aircraft conducting strategic attack, interdiction, suppression of enemy air defenses, as well as offensive and defensive counterair (air-to-air) missions.

History

World War I 
Originally established as an Army Flying School Squadron, the 19th was based in Texas, Ohio, and New York for short periods. After a few weeks at the Air Service Replacement Concentration Barracks in St. Maixent, from 1 January 1918, the squadron moved for Seventh Aviation Instruction Center (repair) at Aulnat Aerodrome, east of Clermont-Ferrand, France, to train and observe the French company Michelin's airplane manufacture and assembly procedures. Till the end of 1918, it remained with the 7th AIC. The squadron left France on March 18, 1919, after departing for Cenac, close to Bordeaux, on December 29.

Inter-war years
Renamed the 19th Pursuit Squadron, the squadron flew from various locations in the Hawaiian Islands beginning in 1923.

World War II

The squadron suffered six casualties as a result of the attack on Pearl Harbor by the Japanese on 7 December 1941, but no fatalities.

Upon arriving, the 19th flew night and day missions, strafing and using general purpose bombs and rockets in support of advancing U.S. ground troops. Using homemade napalm bombs made out of napalm, gasoline, and oil placed inside fuel tanks, the 19th helped U.S. forces successfully invade and capture Saipan, Tinian, and Guam islands in only three months. The squadron's mission then changed to long-range bomber escort missions with occasional strike missions to nearby Pagan Island and Iwo Jima. The squadron then relocated to Okinawa, where the first 19 FS pilots were awarded their 'ace' rating. Later, in August 1945, after numerous aerial victories and assorted bombing missions, it participated in the Japanese surrender.

Cold War

From 1982–1993, it trained for close air support, air-to-air superiority, and maintained a state of readiness to deploy worldwide.  In June 1987, the 19th set a new world record for the number of F-16 sorties flown in one day with 160, besting the previous record of 144.  In September 1992 the 19th deployed to Southwest Asia to fly combat air patrol missions to enforce terms of United Nations cease fire agreement following Operation Desert Storm.

Modern era
On 1 January 1994, the 19th took over personnel, facilities and equipment of 43d Fighter Squadron at Elmendorf Air Force Base, Alaska.  It won the Hughes Trophy in recognition as the top air superiority squadron in the USAF for 2001.  Since 1994, it has mobilized, deployed, and employed fighter aircraft worldwide to accomplish air superiority in support of warfighting commanders.

In 2010 the 19th became part of the 15th Wing at Joint Base Pearl Harbor–Hickam. The 19th is an associate unit with the Hawaii Air National Guard's 199th Fighter Squadron.

Lineage
 19th Aero Squadron
 Organized as the 14th Aero Squadron (I) on 14 June 1917
 Redesignated 19th Aero Squadron on 26 June 1917
 Demobilized on 14 April 1919
 Reconstituted and consolidated with the 19th Pursuit Squadron on 20 December 1923

 19th Fighter Squadron
 Constituted as the 19th Squadron (Pursuit) on 30 August 1921
 Organized on 1 October 1921
 Inactivated on 29 June 1922
 Redesignated 19th Pursuit Squadron on 25 January 1923
 Activated on 1 May 1923
 Redesignated: 19th Pursuit Squadron (Interceptor) on 6 December 1939
 Redesignated: 19th Fighter Squadron on 15 May 1942
 Redesignated: 19th Fighter Squadron, Single Engine on 20 August 1943
 Inactivated on 12 January 1946
 Redesignated 19th Tactical Fighter Squadron on 11 December 1981
 Activated on 1 April 1982
 Redesignated: 19th Fighter Squadron on 1 November 1991
 Inactivated on 31 December 1993
 Activated on 1 January 1994

Assignments 

 Unknown, 14 June 1917 – February 1918
 Seventh Aviation Instruction Center, February–December 1918
 Unknown, January–April 1919
 Ninth Corps Area, 1 October 1921 – 29 June 1922
 17th Composite Group, 1 May 1923
 5th Composite Group, 15 January 1924

 18th Pursuit (later, 18th Fighter) Group, January 1927
 318th Fighter Group, 16 March 1943 – 12 January 1946
 363d Tactical Fighter (later, 363d Fighter) Wing, 1 April 1982
 363d Operations Group, 1 May 1992 – 31 December 1993
 3d Operations Group, 1 January 1994 – 2010
 15th Operations Group, 2010–Present

Stations

 Camp Kelly, Texas, 14 June 1917
 Wilbur Wright Field, Ohio, 1 August 1917
 Garden City, New York, 31 October–3 December 1917
 St Maxient, France, 1 January 1918
 Aulnat aerodrome, France, 6 February 1918
 Cénac, Bordeaux, France, c. 29 December 1918-c. 18 March 1919
 Mitchel Field, New York, c. 5–14 April 1919
 March Field, California, 1 October 1921 – 29 June 1922
 Wheeler Field, Hawaii, 1 May 1923
 Luke Field, Hawaii, 15 January 1924
 Wheeler Field, Hawaii, 11 January 1927
 Bellows Field, Hawaii, 20 February 1942
 Kualoa Airfield, Hawaii, 22 May 1942

 Bellows Field, Hawaii, 20 October 1942
 Barbers Point Naval Air Station, Hawaii, 9 February 1943
 Kipapa Airfield, Hawaii, 30 May 1943
 Stanley Field, Hawaii Territory, 4 September 1943
 Kualoa Airfield, Hawaii, 26 December 1943
 Bellows Field, Hawaii Territory, 18 April 1944
 East Field, Saipan, Mariana Islands, 29 June 1944
 Ie Shima Airfield, Ryukyu Islands, 30 April 1945
 Naha Airfield, Okinawa, November–December 1945
 Fort Lewis, Washington, 11–12 January 1946
 Shaw Air Force Base, South Carolina, 1 April 1982 – 31 December 1993
 Elmendorf Air Force Base, Alaska, 1 January 1994 – 2010
 Joint Base Pearl Harbor–Hickam, Hawaii, 2010–present

Aircraft

 Curtiss JN-6H (1921–1922, 1923–1926)
 Royal Aircraft Factory S.E.5 (1921–1922, 1923–1926)
 Thomas-Morse MB-3 (1923–1926)
 Airco DH.4 (1923–1926)
 Boeing PW-9 (1927–1930)
 Boeing P-12 (1931–1937, 1938–1941)
 Boeing P-26 Peashooter (1938–1941)
 Curtiss P-36 Hawk (1938–1941)
 A-12 Shrike (1938–1941)
 North American BT-9 (1938–1941)
 Douglas OA-3 Dolphin (1938–1941)
 Curtiss P-40 Warhawk (1941–1943)
 Republic P-47 Thunderbolt (1943–1945)
 Lockheed P-38 Lightning (1944–1945)
 General Dynamics F-16 Fighting Falcon (1982–1993)
 McDonnell Douglas F-15 Eagle (1994–2010)
 Lockheed Martin F-22 Raptor (2010–present)

See also

 List of American aero squadrons

References

 Notes

 Citations

Bibliography

External links

019
Military units and formations in Hawaii
019